WiFiDog is an open  source embeddable captive portal solution used to build wireless hotspots.

WiFiDog consists of two components: the gateway and the authentication server. It was written by the technical team of Île Sans Fil and is included in the software package repository of OpenWrt.

Gateway 

The WiFiDog gateway is written in C with no dependencies beyond the Linux kernel. This structure enables it to be embedded in devices such as the WRT54G router running OpenWrt, FreeWRT or DD-WRT or most PCs running Linux. Linux Journal reports that a working gateway install can be packaged in less than 15kB on an i386 platform.

Authentication server 

The WiFiDog authentication server is a PHP and PostgreSQL or MySQL server based solution written to authenticate clients in a captive portal environment. WiFiDog Auth provides portal specific content management, allows users to create wireless internet access accounts using email access, provides gateway uptime statistics and connection specific and user log statistics.

References

External links 

 Project home page
 Chinese WifiDog Community Home Page
 WiFi Foundation uses WiFi Dog for Community WiFi

Wi-Fi